Congenital dyserythropoietic anemia type III (CDA III) is a rare autosomal dominant disorder characterized by macrocytic anemia, bone marrow erythroid hyperplasia and giant multinucleate erythroblasts. New evidence suggests that this may be passed on recessively as well.

Presentation
The signs and symptoms of CDA type III tend to be milder than those of the other types. Most affected individuals do not have hepatosplenomegaly, and iron does not build up in tissues and organs. In adulthood, abnormalities of a specialized tissue at the back of the eye (the retina) can cause vision impairment. Some people with CDA type III also have a blood disorder known as monoclonal gammopathy, which can lead to a cancer of white blood cells (multiple myeloma).

Genetics
CDA type III is transmitted autosomal dominantly. The genetic cause of CDA type III is known to be a problem with the KIF23 gene, located on the long arm of chromosome 15 at a position designated 15q22.

Diagnosis

Treatment
Treatment consists of frequent blood transfusions and chelation therapy. Potential cures include bone marrow transplantation and gene therapy.

See also
 Congenital dyserythropoietic anemia
 Thalassemia
 Hemoglobinopathy
 List of hematologic conditions

References

Further reading
 Congenital dyserythropoietic anemia at the US National Institutes of Health Home Genetic Reference

External links 

Genetic disorders with no OMIM
Anemias